Abraham Lefkowitz (17 October 1884 in Revish, Hungary – 7 November 1956 in New York City, United States) was a co-founder of the American Federation of Teachers, of the New York City Teachers Union in 1916 and the New York City Teachers Guild, which broke off from the Teachers Union in 1935.  For both the Teachers Union and Teachers Guild, he served as legislative representative to relevant New York city and state government bodies.

Lefkowitz studied at City College of New York (Bachelor of Arts, 1904) and New York University (Master of Arts, 1907 and Ph.D., 1914). He taught in the New York City public school system starting in 1903, including at DeWitt Clinton High School and the High School of Commerce. He also  served as the principal of Samuel J. Tilden High School from 1938 to 1955.

See also

 New York City Teachers Union
 New York City Teachers Guild
 American Federation of Teachers
 Henry Linville
 Charles J. Hendley

References

1884 births
1956 deaths
Austro-Hungarian emigrants to the United States
Trade unionists from New York (state)
20th-century American educators
City College of New York alumni
New York University alumni
American Federation of Teachers people